Gyraulus parvus is a species of freshwater snail in the family Planorbidae, the ram's horn snails. It is known by the common name ash gyro. It is native to much of North America and the Caribbean, where it occurs in Canada, the United States, Mexico, Hispaniola, Jamaica, Cuba, and Puerto Rico. It is also an introduced species in Eurasia, including Austria, the Czech Republic, France, Germany, and Israel.

This common snail occurs in many types of freshwater habitat, such as ponds and lakes. It consumes diatoms and other periphyton that it scrapes off of surfaces. It sometimes rests attached to water plants.

This snail has a thin, transparent, whitish-gray shell measuring 2.5 to 5 millimeters wide. It has 4 to 5 whorls. The upper side is concave and the lower side is flat.

This snail is an intermediate host for schistosomes that cause swimmer's itch.

References

parv
Molluscs of North America
Fauna of the Caribbean
Fauna of the Eastern United States
Fauna of the Great Lakes region (North America)
Gastropods described in 1817
Taxa named by Thomas Say